Randall Shedd (born March 5, 1953) is an American politician. He is a member of the Alabama House of Representatives from the 11th District, serving since 2013. He is a member of the Republican Party.

References

Living people
Republican Party members of the Alabama House of Representatives
People from Arab, Alabama
21st-century American politicians
1953 births